Merry Christmas Strait to You! is the first Christmas album by American country music artist George Strait, released on September 8, 1986 by MCA Records. It reached #17 on the Billboard Top Country Albums chart and is certified double platinum by the RIAA.

Track listing

Personnel
George Strait – lead vocals
Curtis "Mr. Harmony" Young – background vocals
Eddie Bayers – drums
Billy Joe Walker Jr. – acoustic guitar
Larry Byrom, Reggie Young – electric guitar
David Hungate – bass guitar
Paul Franklin – steel guitar
John Barlow Jarvis – piano
Johnny Gimble – fiddle

Chart positions

References

1986 Christmas albums
George Strait albums
MCA Records albums
Albums produced by Jimmy Bowen
Christmas albums by American artists
Country Christmas albums